Vernon "Wimpy" Jones (born October 8, 1926) is a Canadian retired professional hockey player who played 182 games for the Pittsburgh Hornets, Buffalo Bisons and Springfield Indians in the American Hockey League. He also played in the United States Hockey League with the Fort Worth Rangers for 89 games, in the Pacific Coast Hockey League for the Seattle Ironmen and 	Vancouver Canucks, and in the Eastern Hockey League for the New Haven Blades and Charlotte Clippers.

External links
 

1926 births
Living people
Canadian ice hockey right wingers
Ice hockey people from Saskatchewan
Sportspeople from Saskatoon